Alanyingi Sylva is a former First Lady of Bayelsa State and spouse of Timipre Sylva. She is the Chairperson of the Center for Gender Values and Culture and in 2021 was honored as the humanitarian person of the year at the Focus Africa Awards.

Personal life 
Alanyingi Sylva is married to the politician Timipre Sylva. They have three children: Taria, Timipre and Pagabio.

See also 

 Patience Jonathan

References 

Living people
HIV/AIDS activists
Akwa Ibom State politicians
First Ladies of Bayelsa State
University of Lagos alumni
Nigerian Roman Catholics
Year of birth missing (living people)